Ramón E. Martínez (born October 10, 1972) is an American former Major League Baseball utility infielder. He is the cousin of catcher Geovany Soto.

Early career
Martínez graduated from Escuela Superior Catolica High School and then attended Vernon Regional Junior College in Texas, where he played baseball and graduated in 1992. He was signed as an undrafted free agent by the Kansas City Royals on January 15, 1993.

Professional career

Kansas City Royals
Martínez made his professional baseball debut with the Gulf Coast Royals in the rookie leagues in 1993 and rose through the Royals farm system with stops in Wilmington, Wichita, and Omaha.

San Francisco Giants
On December 9, 1996, Martínez was traded by the Royals to the San Francisco Giants for Jamie Brewington. He played with the Giants Double-A team in Shreveport and Triple-A teams in Phoenix and Fresno before finally getting his first shot at the big leagues.

Martínez made his major league debut on June 20, 1998, as the starting second baseman for the Giants against the San Diego Padres. He went 3 for 3 in his debut, with his first hit being a single off Mark Langston. He was the first Giant since Willie McCovey to register at least 3 hits in his first Major League game.

He remained on the Giants roster through 2002. The Giants used him as a utility player primarily, with occasional starts at second, shortstop or third.

Chicago Cubs
He left the Giants as a free agent following the 2002 season and signed with the Chicago Cubs, where he was their top infield reserve/pinch hitter for two seasons.

Detroit Tigers/Philadelphia Phillies
Martínez started the 2005 season with the Detroit Tigers and was traded on June 9 to the Philadelphia Phillies alongside Ugueth Urbina for infielder Plácido Polanco. He hit. 286 for the Phillies, who used him as their backup first baseman. Ramon's only home run with the Phillies was a grand slam off Horacio Ramírez on September 14, 2005, in a 12-4 Phillies win.

Los Angeles Dodgers
Martínez signed with the Los Angeles Dodgers prior to the 2006 season and spent the next two seasons as a utility player for the Dodgers, playing solidly in 2006 during injuries to starting second baseman Jeff Kent. His option was not picked up by the club after the 2007 season, but on January 29, 2008, they signed him to a minor league deal with an invitation to spring training. He wound up assigned to the minor league Las Vegas 51s to start the 2008 season, but was injured and spent several months on the DL.

New York Mets
He eventually returned to the 51s, but was released by the Dodgers on July 24 and was signed by the New York Mets to a minor league deal. He was called up late in the 2008 season.  Martinez signed a minor league deal to rejoin the Mets on February 13, 2009.

References

External links

Major League Baseball infielders
Baseball players from Philadelphia
Chicago Cubs players
Los Angeles Dodgers players
Detroit Tigers players
Philadelphia Phillies players
San Francisco Giants players
New York Mets players
Gulf Coast Royals players
Wilmington Blue Rocks players
Rockford Royals players
Wichita Wranglers players
Omaha Royals players
Shreveport Captains players
Phoenix Firebirds players
Fresno Grizzlies players
Toledo Mud Hens players
Las Vegas 51s players
Gulf Coast Dodgers players
New Orleans Zephyrs players
Buffalo Bisons (minor league) players
1972 births
Living people
Vernon Chaps baseball players